Marc-André Moreau (born January 22, 1982 in Chambly, Quebec) is a Canadian freestyle skier.

Moreau, a mogulist has placed in the top-3 in World Cup events on three occasions. In 2004, he won a World Cup event in Mont-Tremblant, Quebec and he picked up a silver medal at the 2005 moguls world championships in Ruka, Finland.

At the 2006 Winter Olympics, Moreau placed fourth in the Moguls event.

External links
 FIS-Ski.com Biography/Results

Canadian male freestyle skiers
Sportspeople from Quebec
People from Chambly, Quebec
Living people
1982 births
Olympic freestyle skiers of Canada
Freestyle skiers at the 2006 Winter Olympics